The Zagreb Points was the name of a resolution released on November 7, 1932, in the Kingdom of Yugoslavia which condemned Serb hegemony in that country and called for a return to political life as it was in 1918.

The document was released after the January 6th Dictatorship of King Alexander resulted in new administrative subdivisions and a new royal constitution. It had the backing of the Peasant-Democrat Coalition and the Party of Rights. The document resulted in other parties producing the Novi Sad Points, Sarajevo Points (Yugoslav Muslim Organization) and Ljubljana Points (Slovene People's Party) to voice their demands for an end to the dictatorship. Croatian Peasant Party leader Vladko Maček was imprisoned for three years as a direct result of the document.

Contributors

Croatian Peasant Party
Vladko Maček
Ante Trumbić
Josip Predavec
Juraj Šutej

Independent Democratic Party
Dušan Bošković
Dušan Kecmanović
Sava Kosanović
Većeslav Vilder
Hinko Krizman

Croatian Party of Rights
Mile Budak

References

Yugoslav Croatia
Politics of the Kingdom of Yugoslavia
1932 in Croatia
Political history of Croatia
1932 in politics
1932 documents
Memoranda